Nasu Motor Sports Land is a 0.72mile (1.146 km) motor racing circuit 667-1 Aza Sakanoue, Terako, Nasushiobara, Tochigi Prefecture 325-0011, East Japan.

References

Motorsport venues in Japan
Sports venues in Tochigi Prefecture
Nasushiobara